Federal Constitution may refer to:
 the United States Constitution
 the Swiss Federal Constitution
 the Malaysian Federal Constitution
 the Federal Constitution of the United Mexican States (disambiguation), several meanings
 the Federal Constitution of the United States of Indonesia

See also 

Constitution